Stânca may refer to several places in Romania:

Villages

 Stânca, a village in the town of Ștefănești, Botoșani County
 Stânca, a village in George Enescu Commune, Botoșani County
 Stânca, a village in Comarna Commune, Iași County
 Stânca, a village in Victoria Commune, Iași County
 Stânca, a village in Pipirig Commune, Neamț County
 Stânca, a village in Zvoriștea Commune, Suceava County
 Stânca, a village in Casimcea Commune, Tulcea County

Rivers and dams
 Stânca River, a tributary of the Agapia River
 Valea Stânca River, a tributary of the Bârzava River
 Stânca-Costești Dam, dam on the Prut

See also
 Stanca (disambiguation)
 Stanča, a village in Trebisov District in the Kosice Region
 Stâncești (disambiguation)
 Stâncuța, a village in Suceava County, Romania
 Stânceni, a village in Mureș County, Romania
 Stâncășeni, a village in Vaslui County, Romania
 Stâna (disambiguation)
 Stan (disambiguation)